Michael A. Waldman is an American attorney and presidential speechwriter and political advisor, currently serving as the president of the Brennan Center for Justice at NYU School of Law, a nonprofit law and policy institute. Waldman has led the center since 2005.

Education 
Waldman earned a Bachelor of Arts degree from Columbia University in 1982 and a Juris Doctor from the New York University School of Law in 1987. During law school, Waldman worked on the New York University Law Review.

Career
From 1993 to 1995, Waldman was a special assistant to President Bill Clinton for policy coordination. As the top White House policy aide on campaign finance reform, he drafted the Clinton administration's public financing proposal. From 1995 to 1999, he was Director of Speechwriting, serving as Assistant to the President, and was responsible for writing or editing nearly 2,000 speeches, including four State of the Union and two Inaugural Addresses.

Prior to his government service, Waldman was the executive director of Public Citizen's Congress Watch, then the capital's largest consumer lobbying office (1989–92). After working in the government, he was a Lecturer in Public Policy at Harvard's John F. Kennedy School of Government (2001–03), teaching courses on political reform, public leadership and communications. He was a partner in a litigation law firm in New York City and Washington, D.C.

In a September 2000 interview with PBS, he discussed his experiences at the White House, including his role as speechwriter, President Clinton's communication style, and the White House response to events such as the Oklahoma City bombing and the Lewinsky scandal.

On April 9, 2021, Waldman was named to the Presidential Commission on the Supreme Court of the United States by President Joe Biden.

Media appearances
Waldman appears frequently on television and radio to discuss public policy, the presidency and the law. Appearances include Good Morning America; PBS Newshour, CBS Evening News; the O'Reilly Factor; Nightline; 60 Minutes; Hardball with Chris Matthews; CNN's Crossfire; the Dylan Ratigan Show; color commentary on NBC (State of the Union) and ABC (Obama inaugural); NPR's Morning Edition; All Things Considered; Fresh Air; Diane Rehm; The Colbert Report; and many other programs. He writes frequently for publications including The New York Times, Washington Post, Newsweek, Slate and Democracy.

Writing 
Waldman is the author of several books, including:
 
 
 
 
 
  Revised edition, 2022.

Personal life
Waldman spent the majority of his childhood in Great Neck, New York. He is married to Elizabeth Fine, currently the counsel to the New York Governor Kathy Hochul. She was previously general counsel to the New York City Council and the Deputy Assistant Attorney General for the United States during the Clinton administration. Together, they have three children. Waldman and his family currently reside in Brooklyn, New York.

His brother, Steven Waldman, co-founded Beliefnet and formerly served as a senior advisor to the chairman of the Federal Communications Commission.

References

External links 
 "Brennan Center for Justice at NYU School of Law"
 "Michael Waldman" on Hardball with Chris Matthews
 "Michael Waldman" on CBS Evening News
 

American speechwriters
Columbia College (New York) alumni
Living people
New York University School of Law alumni
New York University School of Law faculty
People from Great Neck, New York
White House Directors of Speechwriting
Year of birth missing (living people)